Winchester railway station is a railway station in Winchester, Hampshire, England.

Winchester railway station may also refer to:

Winchester Transit Center, in Campbell, California, United States
Winchester railway station (Didcot, Newbury and Southampton Railway), a former railway station in Winchester, Hampshire, England
Winchester Center station in Massachusetts, United States

See also
Winchester (disambiguation)